Giacomo Agostini (born 16 June 1942) is an Italian multi-time world champion Grand Prix motorcycle road racer. Nicknamed Ago, he amassed 122 Grand Prix wins and 15 World Championship titles. Of these, 68 wins and 8 titles came in the 500 cc class, the rest in the 350 cc class. For these achievements obtained over the course of a career spanning 17 years, the AMA described him as "...perhaps the greatest Grand Prix rider of all time". In 2000, Agostini was inducted into the MotoGP Hall of Fame as a MotoGP Legend, while in 2010, he was named an FIM Legend for his motorcycling achievements. He considers himself a "dubious" Roman Catholic.

Early career
Agostini was born in Brescia, Lombardy. His family was from Lovere, where his father was employed in the local town council. The oldest of four brothers, Agostini initially had to steal away to compete, first in hill climb events and then in road racing, as his father did not approve of his son's motorcycle racing career and did everything he could to persuade him not to race.

Eventually his father came to terms with his racing and Agostini won the 1963 Italian 175cc championship aboard a Morini. He got his break when Morini factory rider Tarquinio Provini left the team to ride for Benelli. Count Alfonso Morini hired the young Agostini to ride for him. In 1964, Agostini would win the Italian 350cc title and proved his ability by finishing fourth in the Italian Grand Prix at Monza.

World championships
These results caught the eye of Count Domenico Agusta, who signed Agostini to ride for his MV Agusta squad as Mike Hailwood's teammate. Agostini then fought a season-long battle with Honda's Jim Redman for the 1965 350cc world championship. He seemed to have the title won when he led the final round in Japan at Suzuka when his bike failed him, handing the title to Redman.

At the end of the 1965 season, Hailwood left to join Honda as he had tired of working for the difficult Count Agusta. With Agostini now the top MV Agusta rider, he responded by winning the 500cc title seven years in succession for the Italian factory. He would also win the 350cc title seven times in succession and won 10 Isle of Man TTs. At the time, the Isle of Man TT and the Ulster Grand Prixs were regularly won by Anglophonic (mostly British) riders; in addition to Agostini's successes at the TT he also won 7 Ulster Grand Prix races- he was the only non-British rider to achieve the same kind of success in these British motorcycle races- which were 2 of the most difficult motorcycle races in the world at the time. In 1967 he battled Hailwood in one of the most dramatic seasons in Grand Prix history. Each rider had 5 victories before the championship was decided in Agostini's favor at the last race of the season.

Agostini dropped a bombshell on the Grand Prix world when he announced he would never again race at the Isle of Man TT, after the death of his close friend, Gilberto Parlotti during the 1972 TT. He considered the 37 mile circuit unsafe for world championship competition. At the time, the TT was the most prestigious race on the motorcycling calendar. Other top riders joined his boycott of the event and by 1977, the event was struck from the Grand Prix schedule.

Agostini surprised the racing world when he announced that he would leave MV Agusta to ride for Yamaha in 1974 season. On his first outing for the Japanese factory, he won the prestigious Daytona 200, the premier American motorcycle race. He went on to claim the 1974 350cc World Championship but injuries and mechanical problems kept him from winning the 500cc crown. He rebounded and won the 1975 500cc title, marking the first time a two-stroke machine won the premier class.

The 1975 championship would also be the last world title for the 33-year-old Italian. In 1976, he rode both Yamaha and MV bikes in the 500cc class, yet raced only once in the 350cc to win in Assen. For the challenging Nürburgring, he chose the 500cc MV Agusta and took it to victory, winning the last Grand Prix for both himself, the marque and the last for four-stroke engines in the 500cc class.

He retired from motorcycle competition after finishing 6th in the 1977 season in which he also raced in 750cc endurance races for Yamaha.

Racing car career
Like Jean-Pierre Beltoise, John Surtees and Mike Hailwood before him, Agostini raced in Formula One cars. He competed in non-championship Formula One races in 1978. He competed in the European Formula 2 series in a Chevron B42-BMW and British Aurora Formula 1 with his own team and a Williams FW06. He ended his auto racing career in 1980.

Team manager
In 1982, Agostini returned to motorcycle racing as the Marlboro Yamaha team manager. In this role he won three 500cc titles with Eddie Lawson and managed many successful riders including Graeme Crosby and Kenny Roberts. Under his management riders won the 1982 Daytona Formula 1 (Crosby), 1983 and 1984 Daytona Formula 1 (Roberts) and 1986 Daytona Superbike championships (Lawson).
Between 1986 and 1990 he also managed the Marlboro Yamaha 250cc team with riders like Luca Cadalora, Martin Wimmer and Àlex Crivillé.

Since 1992, he served as the Cagiva factory racing team manager until 1994, when Cagiva withdrew from the world championship.
Agostini's last season as team manager was 1995 when he managed a 250cc Honda team with Doriano Romboni as rider.

Complete Grand Prix motorcycle racing results

Points system from 1964 to 1968:

Points system from 1969 onwards:

Complete Formula 750 Championship results

Complete British Formula One Championship results
(key)

See also
 Legends of Italian sport - Walk of Fame

References

External links
 
 Giacomo-Agostini.com – Official site
 Giacomo Agostini at the Motorcycle Hall of Fame

1942 births
Living people
Sportspeople from Brescia
Italian motorcycle racers
500cc World Championship riders
350cc World Championship riders
Isle of Man TT riders
Italian Formula One drivers
British Formula One Championship drivers
Italian Roman Catholics
500cc World Riders' Champions
350cc World Riders' Champions